Annette Muetze is an electrical engineer from the Graz University of Technology in Graz, Austria. She was named a Fellow of the Institute of Electrical and Electronics Engineers (IEEE) in 2016 for her contributions to the analysis and mitigation of bearing currents in variable-speed drives.

References 

Fellow Members of the IEEE
Living people
Academic staff of the Graz University of Technology
Year of birth missing (living people)
Engineers from Graz